Circus Records is an independent record label founded by Joshua "Flux Pavilion" Steele, Shaun "Doctor P" Brockhurst, Simon Swan and Earl Falconer in 2009. Kanye West and Jay-Z sampled the Flux Pavilion song "I Can't Stop" in  "Who Gon Stop Me". Steele's extended play Blow the Roof also charted at number 60 on the UK Albums Chart.

Artists

See also
 List of record labels

References

External links
 

2009 establishments in England
British companies established in 2009
Record labels established in 2009
Dubstep record labels
English electronic dance music record labels
Record labels based in London